is a Japanese novelist, visual novel writer and anime screenwriter. He is known for being the co-creator of the highly acclaimed and commercially successful anime series Puella Magi Madoka Magica, which earned him the Tokyo Anime Award for Best Scriptwriter, as well as the writer of the 2003 visual novel Saya no Uta, the 2012 anime Psycho-Pass, the light novel and anime Fate/Zero, and the 2013–2014 tokusatsu show Kamen Rider Gaim. He currently works at Nitroplus and Nitro+chiral. Anime written by Urobuchi that have won the Newtype Anime Awards have been Puella Magi Madoka Magica in 2011, Fate/Zero in 2012 and Psycho-Pass: The Movie in 2015.

History
Urobuchi graduated from Wako University with a degree in History. He aspired to become a novelist and after seeing Shizuku and Kizuato by Leaf, he felt confident about the range of expression that games have. He then started working at Nitroplus and worked on Phantom of Inferno as his debut series.

Writing style
In choosing names for the characters he develops, Urobuchi has stated that he shies away from selecting generic names that would match their personalities and instead opts for more unusual names that he believes would eliminate noise when fans try finding information on the characters with search engines. In a discussion with Urobuchi, manga writer Kazuo Koike contrasted this decision with the naming style in his own works, which emphasized more forthright names that were easier to remember. However, he found that Urobuchi's method could be effective for allowing viewers to "involve themselves deeper into the story and actively work to understand the characters." Urobuchi also said he attempts to keep at least one trait in common between each individual character and himself so that he can always identify with them on some level.

Work

Visual novels

Manga
 Vampirdzhija Vjedogonia (with Tetsuya Sakata). Serialized in Comic Dragon, 2 volumes published by Dragon Comics (Kadokawa Shoten). August 2001, February 2002.  
 Ancient Misty (with Tetsuya Nakamura). Serialized in Dengeki Comic Gao!, 1 volume published by Dengeki Comics (MediaWorks). August 27, 2007.

Light novels

Anime

Series

Movies

Sound dramas
 Kikokugai: The Cyber Slayer (2004) - Script
 Fate/Zero (2008-2013) - Original creator, script (BD boxsets bonus)

Other video games

Other

Series

Movies

Awards

References

External links
 
 
 

1972 births
Anime screenwriters
Dark fantasy writers
20th-century Japanese novelists
21st-century Japanese novelists
Japanese horror writers
Japanese psychological fiction writers
Japanese science fiction writers
Japanese screenwriters
Japanese video game designers
Living people
Thriller writers
Writers from Tokyo